Keith Chapman (born 1959) is a British television writer and producer, best known as the creator of children's television programmes Bob the Builder and PAW Patrol.

Biography
He worked for Jim Henson International, designing characters related to the Muppets, before leaving to pursue a career in advertising.

While freelancing as an agency art director in the early 1990s, Chapman worked on his own creations, one of them being Bob the Builder, who was created after he spotted a JCB backhoe loader on a work site and thought they could bring it to life with cartoon eyes, which became the character Scoop (then named "Digger"), followed by other machines, and then thought the machines needed a human operator, which led to the creation of Bob, eventually showing it and his other creations to Peter Orton, executive chairman of HIT Entertainment, and Orton, sensing potential in Bob the Builder, acquired the intellectual property rights and created a television show based on the property. The deal saw Chapman retain a share of the copyright and also a contractual clause which sees his name appear on all merchandise related to the character including an appearance on the blockbuster film Elf.

Bob the Builder was produced at Manchester's HOT Animation Studio, with Curtis Jobling's character and world designs helping propel the character, and the show, onto a global audience.  The show became a huge success, generating around £1 billion in international retail sales. Chapman decided to invest his share of the profits in setting up his own television production and rights ownership company, Chapman Entertainment, stating his belief that "the closer involvement of creative talent can get more out of a property over the longer term".

In 2005, Chapman created Fifi and the Flowertots.

In 2007, Chapman produced Roary the Racing Car.

In 2013, Chapman created Nickelodeon's PAW Patrol.

In 2020, a new show from Chapman named Mighty Express was announced, premiering on Netflix in September of the same year.

In 2022, Chapman partnered with MXT to create an NFT project called Moonie Moo.

Personal life
In 2013, Keith Chapman split from his wife. He is now married to Emily, whom he married in 2019. Keith originates from Norfolk, East Anglia, though some of his formative years were spent in Basildon, Essex where he went to Nicholas Comprehensive School. Keith attended art college in Great Yarmouth. He has 3 sons and a daughter and currently resides in Monaco.

References

1959 births
Advertising directors
British television writers
Living people
Muppet designers
Alumni of Norwich University of the Arts